Dilini Kanchana (born 18 May 1995) is a Sri Lankan rugby sevens player.

Kanchana was named in Sri Lanka's squad for the 2022 Commonwealth Games in Birmingham, they finished eighth overall.

References 

Living people
1995 births
Female rugby sevens players
Sri Lanka international women's rugby sevens players
Rugby sevens players at the 2022 Commonwealth Games